The Real-time Neutron Monitor Database (or NMDB) is a worldwide network of standardized neutron monitors, used to record variations of the primary cosmic rays. The measurements complement space-based cosmic ray measurements.

Unlike data from satellite experiments,  neutron monitor data has never been available in high resolution from many stations in real-time. The data is often only available from the individual stations website, in varying formats, and not in real-time. To overcome this deficit, the European Commission is supporting the Real-time Neutron Monitor Database (NMDB) as an e-Infrastructures project in the Seventh Framework Programme in the Capacities section. Stations that do not have 1-minute resolution will be supported by the development of an affordable standard registration system that will submit the measurements to the database via the internet in real-time. This resolves the problem of different data formats and for the first time allows to use real-time cosmic ray measurements for space weather predictions (Steigies, Klein et al.)

Besides creating a database and developing applications working with this data, a part of the project is dedicated to create a public outreach website to inform about cosmic rays and possible effects on humans, technological systems, and the environment (Mavromichalaki et al.)

See also
Altitude SEE Test European Platform (ASTEP)

References

External links
NMDB Homepage

Cosmic-ray experiments
Real-time technology
Astronomical databases